João Pedro Martins Cunha Fernandes (born 5 February 1997) known as Joãozinho,  is a Portuguese footballer who plays for Montalegre as a midfielder.

Club career
On 21 September 2016, Joãozinho made his professional debut with Fafe in a 2016–17 LigaPro match against Portimonense.

References

External links

Stats and profile at LPFP 

1997 births
Living people
Portuguese footballers
Association football midfielders
Liga Portugal 2 players
AD Fafe players
Vitória S.C. B players
C.D.C. Montalegre players
Sportspeople from Guimarães